Monosyntaxis samoensis is a moth of the family Erebidae. It was described by Hans Rebel in 1915. It is found on Samoa in the South Pacific Ocean.

References

Lithosiina
Moths described in 1915